The Italian Vertical Kilometer Championships are the national championships in vertical kilometer, organised every year by the FIDAL from 2012 (first edition was held in Chiavenna).

Editions

FISKY Italian Championships

The skyrunning specialty of the vertical kilometer was born in 2008, in Italy the Skyrunnig Italian Federation (FISKY) organizes the Skyrunning Italian Championship since 2003, but until 2010 was assigned a single national title, and since 2011 the titles were awarded in the various specialties. For the vertical kilometer these are the winners.

References

External links
FIDAL web site
FISKY web site

Skyrunning competitions
Vertical
Athletics competitions in Italy
National athletics competitions
Recurring sporting events established in 2012
2012 establishments in Italy
Vertical kilometer running competitions